The discography of Deftones, an American alternative metal band, consists of nine studio albums, three extended plays, three compilation albums, five demo albums and 22 singles. Their back-catalogue of B-side material encompasses 52 tracks. One release is certified gold by the RIAA in recognition of shipments exceeding 500,000 copies, and three are certified platinum for exceeding one million copies. They have sold over 10 million albums worldwide.

Deftones formed in 1988 in Sacramento, California. Their first commercially released album was Adrenaline, in 1995. It peaked at number 23 in the Billboard Heatseekers Albums chart, its success attributable to word-of-mouth and rigorous touring and live performance. 1997's Around the Fur was far more successful, peaking at number one on the Billboard Heatseekers Albums chart, and at number 29 on the Billboard 200. It was also their first international success, entering the UK Albums Chart at number 56. The album provided their first ever charting singles, "My Own Summer (Shove It)" and "Be Quiet and Drive (Far Away)". White Pony was released in 2000 to critical acclaim and unprecedented commercial success, peaking at number three in the US. Singles "Change (In the House of Flies)" and "Digital Bath" supported the album's release. A single entitled "Back to School (Mini Maggit)" was released as a rap-influenced reinterpretation of White Pony's closing track, "Pink Maggit". While commercially successful and a fan favorite, the band have vociferously objected to its publication. White Pony was subsequently re-released with "Back to School (Mini Maggit)" as the album's opening track.

The eponymous Deftones was released in 2003, peaking at number two in the US, and garnering widespread international success. B-Sides & Rarities saw a release in 2005, bringing together unreleased and obscure material accrued since 1995. 2006's Saturday Night Wrist, completed after a protracted and tumultuous recording process, reached number ten in the US. "Hole in the Earth" peaked at number 18 on the Billboard Alternative Songs chart, while "Mein" only reached number 40 on the Mainstream Rock chart. The band's sixth album, Diamond Eyes, was released on May 4, 2010. It saw the release of the popular singles "Rocket Skates", "You've Seen the Butcher" and "Diamond Eyes". In November 2012, Deftones released their seventh studio album titled Koi No Yokan, which spawned the singles "Leathers", "Tempest", "Swerve City" and "Romantic Dreams". Their eighth studio album, Gore, was released on April 8, 2016, and spawned the singles "Prayers / Triangles", "Doomed User", and "Hearts / Wires". Ohms, Deftones’ ninth album, was released in 2020 with the eponymous single “Ohms” and the single “Genesis”.

Albums

Studio albums

Compilation albums

Demo albums

Video albums

Unfinished albums

Extended plays

Singles

Promotional singles

B-sides

Original material

Covers

Acoustic versions

Remixes

Live versions
All live tracks from the two "My Own Summer (Shove It)" singles, respectively, were compiled into a live EP entitled Live.

Music videos

Notes

A  "Change (In the House of Flies)" did not enter the Billboard Hot 100, but peaked at number five on the Bubbling Under Hot 100 Singles chart.
B  "Minerva" did not enter the Billboard Hot 100, but peaked at number 20 on the Bubbling Under Hot 100 Singles chart.
C  "Rocket Skates" did not enter the Billboard Hot 100, but peaked at number 12 on the Hot Singles Sales chart.

References

External links
 
 
 [ Deftones] at Allmusic

Discography
Discographies of American artists
Heavy metal group discographies